Kjell Alseth (born 15 August 1960 in Stjørdal) is a Norwegian Football referee. He represents Stjørdals/Blink. Alseth debuted as referee in Tippeligaen 18 August 1996 in Skeid's 3–1 victory against Stabæk. He has (pr 28 June 2007 refereed 153 Norwegian football matches. He has formerly been a UEFA official, and is known to have served as a referee in FIFA matches in 2002.

References

Norwegian football referees
1960 births
Living people
People from Stjørdal